Haptoderodes is a genus of beetles in the family Carabidae, containing the following species:

 Haptoderodes convexus Straneo, 1986
 Haptoderodes planulus Straneo, 1986

References

Pterostichinae